The 2012 Iowa State Senate elections took place as part of the biennial 2012 United States elections. Iowa voters elected state senators in 26 of the state senate's 50 districts—the 25 even-numbered state senate districts and the 49th district. State senators serve four-year terms in the Iowa State Senate, with half of the seats up for election each cycle. This was the first election cycle following the 2010 census and 2011 redistricting process.

As a result of redistricting, many state senators were redrawn into new seats. This explains some incumbents being reelected, but into districts with new numbers following the redistricting process.

The primary election on June 5, 2012 determined which candidates appeared on the November 6, 2012 general election ballot. Primary election results can be obtained here.

Following the previous 2010 Iowa Senate election, Democrats maintained control of the Iowa state Senate with 26 seats.

To reclaim control of the chamber from Democrats, the Republicans needed to net 2 Senate seats.

Democrats kept control of the Iowa State Senate following the 2012 general election as the chamber's partisan composition remained unchanged with 26 Democrats to 24 Republicans.

State Senator Pat Ward was running in district 22 when she died on October 15, 2012, less than a month before the general election. A special election on Dec. 11, 2012 saw her seat retained by the Republicans.

Summary of Results
NOTE: Only even-numbered Iowa Senate seats were up for regularly-scheduled election in 2012, so most of the odd-numbered seats are not included here. District 49 had a special election to fill a vacancy created by Senator Bacon's resignation.
Also note, an asterisk (*) after a Senator's name indicates they were an incumbent re-elected, but to a new district number due to redistricting. 

Source:

Detailed Results

Note: If a district does not list a primary, then that district did not have a competitive primary (i.e., there may have only been one candidate file for that district).

District 2

District 4

District 6

District 8

District 10

District 12

District 14

District 16

District 18

District 20

District 22

Senator Ward died less than a month before the 2012 general election and, since the ballots had already been printed, won this election after having already deceased. A special election was held due to these circumstances.

District 24

District 26

District 28

District 30

District 32

District 34

District 36

District 38

District 40

District 42

District 44

District 46

District 48

District 49

District 50

Source:

See also
 United States elections, 2012
 United States House of Representatives elections in Iowa, 2012
 Elections in Iowa

References

Senate
Iowa Senate elections
Iowa State Senate